McLachlan, McLachlan or McLaglen is a surname. It is derived from the Irish MacLachlainn, which is in turn a patronymic form of the Gaelic personal name Lachlann. Notable people with the surname include:

McLachlan
Alexander McLachlan (politician) (1872–1956), Australian senator
Alexander McLachlan (poet) (1818–1896), Scottish-born Canadian poet
Andrew McLachlan (born 1966), Australian politician, army man and lawyer
Angus McLachlan (born 1944), Australian pastoralist and former first-class cricketer
Ben McLachlan (born 1992), New Zealand–Japanese tennis player
C. Ian McLachlan (born 1942), justice of the Connecticut Supreme Court
Craig McLachlan (born 1965), Australian actor and singer
George McLachlan (1901–1964), Scottish footballer
Ian McLachlan (born 1936), Australian landowner
James McLachlan (disambiguation)
Jimmy McLachlan (born 1870; fl. 1890s), Scottish footballer
John McLachlan (disambiguation)
Laurentia McLachlan (1866–1953), Scottish Benedictine nun
Mark McLachlan (born 1990), American product & game designer
Michael A. McLachlan (born 1958), American politician
Mike McLachlan (1946–2021), American politician
Robert McLachlan (disambiguation)
Sarah McLachlan (born 1968), Canadian musician
Tom McLachlan (1912–1986), Australian rugby league footballer

Virginia McLachlan (born 1992), Canadian Paralympic sprinter
William McLachlan (disambiguation)

MacLachlan
Angus MacLachlan (born 1959), playwright and screenwriter
Crawford Maclachlan (1867–1952), British admiral
Ewen MacLachlan (1775–1822), Scottish Gaelic scholar and poet
Kyle MacLachlan (born 1959), American actor
Malcolm MacLachlan, Professor of Global Health at Trinity College Dublin
Patricia MacLachlan (1938–2022), American children's writer
Ross MacLachlan (born 1957), Canadian singer and pianist
James MacLachlan (1919–1943), British Royal Air Force pilot and flying ace of the Second World War

McLaglen
Victor McLaglen (1886–1959), British-born American actor

Clan
 Clan Maclachlan, Scottish clan

Fictional characters
Ryan McLachlan, fictional character
Tiffany McLachlan, fictional character

See also
 McLachlin (surname)
 McLoughlin
 Lachlan (disambiguation)
 McLoughlin, for the Irish origins of the name

References

Surnames of Scottish origin
Patronymic surnames